Berthold III may refer to:
 Berthold III, Duke of Zähringen ( – 1122)
 Berthold III of Andechs ( – 1188)